JWH-018 (1-pentyl-3-(1-naphthoyl)indole, NA-PIMO or AM-678) is an analgesic chemical from the naphthoylindole family that acts as a full agonist at both the CB1 and CB2 cannabinoid receptors, with some selectivity for CB2. It produces effects in animals similar to those of tetrahydrocannabinol (THC), a cannabinoid naturally present in cannabis, leading to its use in synthetic cannabis products that in some countries are sold legally as "incense blends".

As a full agonist at both the CB1 and CB2 cannabinoid receptors, this chemical compound is classified as an analgesic medication. The analgesic effects of cannabinoid ligands, mediated by CB1 receptors are well established in treatment of neuropathic pain, as well as cancer pain and arthritis.

These compounds work by mimicking the body's naturally-produced endocannabinoid hormones such as 2-AG and anandamide (AEA), which are biologically active and can exacerbate or inhibit nerve signaling. As the cause is poorly understood in chronic pain states, more research and development must be done before the therapeutic potential of this class of biologic compounds can be realized.

History 
John W. Huffman, an organic chemist at Clemson University, synthesized a variety of chemical compounds that affect the endocannabinoid system. JWH-018 is one of these compounds, with studies showing an affinity for the cannabinoid (CB1) receptor five times greater than that of THC. Cannabinoid receptors are found in mammalian brain and spleen tissue; however, the structural details of the active sites are currently unknown.

On December 15, 2008, it was reported by German pharmaceutical companies that JWH-018 was found as one of the active components in at least three versions of the grey market drug Spice, which has been sold as an incense in a number of countries around the world since 2002. An analysis of samples acquired four weeks after the German prohibition of JWH-018 took place found that the manufacturers had shortened the alkyl chain by one carbon to circumvent the ban.

Pharmacology
JWH-018 is a full agonist of both the CB1 and CB2 cannabinoid receptors, with a reported binding affinity of 9.00 ± 5.00 nM at CB1 and 2.94 ± 2.65 nM at CB2. JWH-018 has an EC50 of 102 nM for human CB1 receptors, and 133 nM for human CB2 receptors. JWH-018 produces bradycardia and hypothermia in rats at doses of 0.3–3 mg/kg, suggesting potent cannabinoid-like activity.

Pharmacokinetics
Metabolism of JWH-018 was assessed using Wistar rats which had been administered an ethanolic extract containing JWH-018. Urine was collected for 24 hours, followed by extraction of JWH-018 metabolites using both liquid-liquid extraction and solid-phase extraction. GC-MS was utilized to separate and identify the extracted compounds. JWH-018 and its N-dealkylated metabolite were only detected in small amounts, with hydroxylated N-dealkylated metabolites comprising the primary signal. The observed mass shift indicates that it is likely that hydroxylation occurs in both the naphthalene and indole portions of the molecule. Human metabolites were similar although most metabolism took place on the indole ring and pentyl side chain, and the hydroxylated metabolites were extensively conjugated with glucuronide.

Usage 
At least one case of JWH-018 dependence has been reported by the media. The user consumed JWH-018 daily for eight months.  Withdrawal symptoms were more severe than those experienced as a result of cannabis dependence. JWH-018 has been shown to cause profound changes in CB1 receptor density following administration, causing desensitization to its effects more rapidly than related cannabinoids.

On October 15, 2011, Anderson County coroner Greg Shore attributed the death of a South Carolina college basketball player to "drug toxicity and organ failure" caused by JWH-018. An November 2011 email concerning the case was released in December 2011 under the Freedom of Information Act after multiple requests to see the information had been denied.

Compared to THC, which is a partial agonist at CB1 receptors, JWH-018, and many synthetic cannabinoids, are full agonists. THC has been shown to inhibit GABA receptor neurotransmission in the brain via several pathways. JWH-018 may cause intense anxiety, agitation, and, in rare cases (generally with non-regular JWH users), has been assumed to have been the cause of seizures and convulsions by inhibiting GABA neurotransmission more effectively than THC. Cannabinoid receptor full agonists may present serious dangers to the user when used to excess.

Various physical and psychological adverse effects have been reported from JWH-018 use. One study reported psychotic relapses and anxiety symptoms in well-treated patients with mental illness following JWH-018 inhalation. Due to concerns about the potential of JWH-018 and other synthetic cannabinoids to cause psychosis in vulnerable individuals, it has been recommended that people with risk factors for psychotic illnesses (like a past or family history of psychosis) not use these substances.

Detection in biological fluids
JWH-018 usage is readily detected in urine using "spice" screening immunoassays from several manufacturers focused on both the parent drug and its omega-hydroxy and  carboxyl metabolites. JWH-018 will not be detected by older methods employed for detecting THC and other cannabis terpenoids.  Determination of the parent drug in serum or its metabolites in urine has been accomplished by GC-MS or LC-MS. Serum JWH-018 concentrations are generally in the 1–10 μg/L range during the first few hours after recreational usage. The major urinary metabolite is a compound that is monohydroxylated on the omega minus one carbon atom of the alkyl side chain. A lesser metabolite monohydroxylated on the omega (terminal) position was present in the urine of six users of the drug at concentrations of 6–50 μg/L, primarily as a glucuronide conjugate.

Legal status

Synthesis

See also

References

External links
 User of legal high

Designer drugs
Euphoriants
JWH cannabinoids
Naphthoylindoles
CB1 receptor agonists
CB2 receptor agonists